Daphnella elegantissima is a species of sea snail, a marine gastropod mollusk in the family Raphitomidae.

Description
The length of the shell attains 15 mm.

Distribution
This species occurs in the Caribbean Sea off Cuba and the Grenadines.

References

 Espinosa J. & Fernández-Garcés R. (1990). El género Daphnella (Mollusca: Neogastropoda) en Cuba. Descripción de nuevas especies. Poeyana. 396: 1-16.

External links
 MNHN, Paris: specimen
 Gastropods.com: Daphnella elegantissima
 

elegantissima
Gastropods described in 1990